Tomasz Radziwon (born 29 August 1980 in Poland) is a Polish retired footballer.

Career

By the age of 15, Radziwon had debuted in the Polish fourth division with Sokół Ostróda.

In 1995/96, Radziwon left Sokół for top division Stomil Olsztyn's youth team, partially on the advice of the Polish football federation, who wanted him to develop at a higher level.

After the 1997 UEFA European Under-16 Championship, Radziwon was offered a youth contract with Borussia Dortmund in the German Bundesliga. However, he refused the offer, thinking it was not the right time to leave Poland. In 2001, he said that he regretted not accepting the contract.

In 2003, after failing to establish himself in the first team of Stomil Olsztyn and Pogoń Szczecin, Radziwon returned to Sokół Ostróda in the Polish third division, where his father coached.

Despite not playing for a few seasons, Radziwon was persuaded to join Kormoran Zwierzewo because his father wanted promotion to the district league.

He now runs R-GOL, a football store, with his brother Marcin.

References

External links
 Tomasz Radziwon at 90minut

1980 births
Living people
Polish footballers
Association football midfielders
Sokół Ostróda players
OKS Stomil Olsztyn players
Pogoń Szczecin players
Sportspeople from Olsztyn
Szczakowianka Jaworzno players